Seamus Kelly may refer to:

 Seamus Kelly (footballer) (born 1974), Irish footballer
 Seamus Kelly (rugby union) (born 1991), American rugby union player